These are the Billboard magazine number-one albums of 1966, per the Billboard 200.

Chart history

See also
1966 in music
List of number-one albums (United States)

References

1966
United States Albums